The Hart and Lorne Terrific Hour is a Canadian television variety show that aired on CBC Television in 1970 and 1971. It was part of Sunday At Nine, a CBC anthology that included documentaries, dramas (such as Corwin), and "light entertainment", both domestic and imported.  The show starred Hart Pomerantz and Lorne Michaels.  The show mixed comedy sketches with musical guests, in a format similar to Rowan & Martin's Laugh-In, the show that Michaels was working on before returning to Canada to star in his own show.

Cast
 Lorne Michaels
 Hart Pomerantz

The cast also included: 

 Dan Aykroyd
 Victor Garber
 Paul Bradley
 Marvin Goldhar
 Eleanor Beecroft
 Sydney Brown
 Jackie Burroughs
 Jayne Eastwood
 Alec Englander
 Andrea Martin
 Charles Palmer
 Allan Price
 Ted Turner
 Steve Weston

Musical guests

Among the show's musical guests were  James Taylor  and Cat Stevens.

References

External links
Setting up the opening monologue from CBC ("set sketch" for the opening monologue set-up for The Hart and Lorne Terrific Hour)

1970s Canadian variety television series
CBC Television original programming
1970s Canadian sketch comedy television series
1970 Canadian television series debuts
1971 Canadian television series endings